May Bukas Pa is a Philippine drama television series produced by Dreamscape Entertainment and directed by Jerome Chavez Pobocan, Jojo A. Saguin, and Erick C. Salud. The series features an ensemble cast consisting of Zaijian Jaranilla, Albert Martinez, Dina Bonnevie, Tonton Gutierrez, Maja Salvador, Rayver Cruz, Dominic Ochoa, Desiree del Valle, Precious Lara Quigaman, Lito Pimentel, and Jaime Fabregas. The series aired on ABS-CBN's Primetime Bida block from February 2, 2009, to February 5, 2010, replacing Eva Fonda and was replaced by Agua Bendita.

The series was the highest rated program on Philippine television from 2009 to June 3, 2011 when the 2010–2011 series Mara Clara became the highest-rating show for 2011.

It is the revival show of the original May Bukas Pa program that ran on IBC and RPN from 2000 to 2001.

Series overview

Plot
The story revolves around Santino (Zaijian Jaranilla), a wide-eyed young boy who was orphaned as a baby before being adopted and raised by Franciscans. Living in the fictional town of Barangay Bagong Pag-asa, he eventually discovers the ability to see and speak with Jesus Christ, whom he fondly called “Bro”. He also gains the ability to miraculously heal the sick. With these special abilities, Santino goes out to help other people with their problems and make a difference in their lives.

It focuses about kindness and morality in humanity. A child who believes that there's always a way to fix everything even if you did something bad. He believes that "Bro", his nickname for Jesus Christ, will always guide them by the light. It has such a great impact in most of the Filipinos on how they view life on a positive sides.

Cast and characters

Main cast

Zaijian Jaranilla as Santino Guillermo/Gabriel M. Policarpio/Rodrigo 
Albert Martinez as Mayor Enrique D. Rodrigo/Gonzalvo Policarpio†
Jairus Aquino as young Enrique Rodrigo/Gonzalvo Policarpio
Dina Bonnevie as Malena Rodriguez-Rodrigo/Policarpio†
Precious Lara Quigaman as Criselda "Sélda" Rodriguez-Sta. Maria 
Tonton Gutierrez as Mario Sta. Maria 
Maja Salvador as Stella R. Sta. Maria 
Rayver Cruz as Francisco "Cocoy" Bautista 
Desiree del Valle as Clautilde Katerina "Tilde" Magdayo-Rodrigo/Policarpio

Spiritual characters
Love Thadani (uncredited) as Jesus Christ 
Uncredited voice actor as Satan
Charo Santos-Concio as Mother Mary

The Priests
Jaime Fabregas as Fr. Anthony Ruiz 
Dominic Ochoa as Fr. José dela Cruz 
Lito Pimentel as Fr. Gregorio "Ringo" Samonte and Rodjun Cruz as young Gregorio "Ringo" Samonte
Badjie Mortiz as Fr. Paul Makopa 
David Chua as Fr. Chino "Chi" Wang 
Andre Tiangco as Fr. George 
Ruben Gonzaga as Fr. Patrick 
Edgar Sandalo as Fr. Jude

Supporting cast
Ogie Diaz as Renato "Atong" Arguelles 
Arlene Muhlach as Viviana "Baby" Arguelles 
Timothy Chan as Rico R. Rodrigo/Policarpio 
Phoebe Khae Arbotante as Joy R. Sta. Maria
Victor Basa as Fr. John Delgado

Additional cast
Francis Magundayao as Paco 
Miguelito de Guzman as Alfred 
Liza Lorena as Doña Anita Rodriguez 
Michael Conan as Dante Maoricio 
Ron Morales as Robert Sanchez/ Gustavo Policarpio 
Jerry O'Hara as Senior Superintendent Raul Guevarra
Rosalie, Kimberly, and Jennifer as fictitious versions of themselves 
Erin Panlilio as Grace

Guest Cast

Production
The series was announced on January 9, 2009, under the working title "Marcelino" before changing to its final title "May Bukas Pa" as ABS-CBN's first offering for 2009 where story conference for the series was done, with production and principal photography of the series made from January 15, 2009, to February 5, 2010. Most of the scenes are taped in San Guillermo Parish Church in Barangay Cabambangan & Municipal Hall of Bacolor in Barangay Calibutbut of  Bacolor, Pampanga.

In 2009, Maja Salvador took a break from the show for three months in order to focus on Nagsimula sa Puso. At the same time, she and Precious Lara Quigaman had announced that they have joined their new show Precious Hearts Romances Presents: Impostor which came out in 2010.

Marketing

Music

Theme song
The theme song of the religious drama with the same title was originally performed by Rico J. Puno. The first version is sung by Kyle Balili and the second version is sung by Erik Santos.

Soundtrack

ABS-CBN Christmas ID

ABS-CBN's Christmas 2009 campaign was inspired by the show's popularity. The song is entitled "Star ng Pasko". Christmas lanterns were specially created by ABS-CBN that are sold to benefit ABS-CBN foundation's charity programs. ABS-CBN launched Parol ni Bro November 4, 2009, where an 18-foot Christmas lantern on the top of ABS-CBN building was lit up by the May Bukas Pa cast, ABS-CBN president Charo Santos-Concio, and ABS-CBN chairman and CEO Eugenio Lopez III.

It was later used for the network's 2010 and 2019 Christmas Station IDs "Ngayong Pasko Magniningning Ang Pilipino" and "Family is Forever". It also has musical similarities with the 2002, 2004, 2007, 2010, 2017, and 2020 Christmas Station IDs "Isang Pamilya, Isang Puso, Ngayong Pasko", "Sabay Tayo, Kapamilya", "Walang Mag-iisa Ngayong Pasko", "Ngayong Pasko Magniningning Ang Pilipino", "Just Love Ngayong Christmas", and "Ikaw ang Liwanag at Ligaya". GMA also had its 2019 Christmas Station ID "Love Shines" having scenes patterned after the 2009 ID.

Reception
Due to the show's ratings, ABS-CBN's management has decided to extend it for 20 weeks instead of the initial eight weeks. On June 23, 2009, ABS-CBN television head Cory Vidanes announced that the show would be extended until February 2010.

May Bukas Pa became the first primetime TV series in the Philippines to have lasted at least a full year and end in the 2010s decade, peaking during its finale with 47.3% nationwide rating according to Kantar Media/TNS. It currently stands as the country's highest-rated show of all time since Philippine television switched to nationwide TV ratings system in the opening day of 2009.

Critical reception
Entertainment columnist Nestor Torre of the Philippine Daily Inquirer said "It must have been a big decision for the new show’s producers to get away from that downbeat view of life and come up with this Marcelino Pan Y Vino-inspired tale. But it’s great to note that the gamble has paid off in a big way: May Bukas Pa has been enjoying very good ratings, proving what we’ve been saying all this time--that viewers want to be inspired by the dramas they watch." However, he criticized the show's "religious" scenes which are "poorly, shallowly staged, thus making genuine inspiration and devotion difficult to come by while viewing the series." He further criticized the show's use of extras mostly playing sick people, who turn out to be bad actors. He adds, "Any director worth his salt would have sensed that the montage of healing needed good actors to make it meaningful and moving. Why were inept actors used instead? Possibly because the production was scrimping on talent fees. Well, it was a penny-wise pound-foolish decision, because the important sequence was botched."

Accolades

May Bukas Pa also received an award at the 2009 Catholic Mass Media Awards (besides its Best Drama award), given by Cardinal Archbishop Gaudencio Rosales. The award was received by lead star Zaijian Jaranilla and the supporting actors who play priests (who also wore cassocks for the occasion).

Anak TV Seal Awards Most Admired Program, Zaijian Jaranilla as Male Makabata Awardee.

In other media
The movie Pak! Pak! My Dr. Kwak!, released on April 23, 2011 one year and two months after May Bukas Pa ended, has similarities with the series where Zaijian Jaranilla (who portrays as Angelito in the movie) can able to do miracles to help other people such as healing the sick as well as communicating with spiritual beings (Bro/Jesus Christ and Satan (in the form of a red light) in May Bukas Pa, and God (as a white light) in Pak! Pak! My Dr. Kwak!).

On May 22, 2011, ABS-CBN aired a documentary entitled Banál (Tagalog for "holy") on the occasion of the beatification of Pope John Paul II. Zaijian Jaranilla and Jaime Fabregas reprised their roles as Santíno and Father Anthony as they present the life of John Paul II and his significance for Filipinos.

References

External links
May Bukas Pa ABS-CBN

2000s children's television series
2010s children's television series
2000s Philippine television series
2010s Philippine television series
2009 Philippine television series debuts
2010 Philippine television series endings
ABS-CBN drama series
Atheism in television
Fiction about God
Filipino-language television shows
Portrayals of Jesus on television
Christian children's television series
Television shows about Catholicism
Television series by Dreamscape Entertainment Television
Television shows filmed in the Philippines